Uriel Lynn (born 2 April 1935) is an Israeli lawyer, former civil servant and politician. Currently president of the Federation of the Israeli Chambers of Commerce and the Tel Aviv and Central Israel Chamber of Commerce, he served as a member of the Knesset for Likud between 1984 and 1992.

Biography
Lynn was born Uriel Asulin in Jerusalem during the Mandate era. His father, Yehonatan Asulin was from Morocco, while his mother, Margalit Hazan, was born in Palestine. His grandfather, rabbi Ben-Zion Mordechai Hazan, was one of the founders of the Porat Yosef Yeshiva in Jerusalem, and officially handed over the Old City of Jerusalem to the Jordanians during the Israeli surrender there in the 1948 Arab-Israeli War. Lynn attended the Nautical School in Haifa. He served in the 7th Armored Brigade of the Israel Defense Forces, and fought as a reservist in the Suez Crisis, Six-Day War, and Yom Kippur War. and afterwards studied law at the Hebrew University of Jerusalem and University of California, Berkeley, earning an LLM from both universities. He was certified as a lawyer devoting two years in litigation of cases related to traffic accidents and from 1965 until 1970 worked as secretary and legal advisor at the ATA textile company.

Between 1969 and 1971 he worked as deputy general manager at Isranyl, a textile factory, which later on was transformed to Jerusalem Jersey Textile where he continued working as managing director between 1972 and 1979.

In 1973 Lynn joined the Liberal Party, which was part of the Likud alliance. He was placed 56th on the Likud list for the 1977 Knesset elections, but failed to win a seat. In 1978, following Likud's election victory, Lynn became a civil servant after being appointed Director of the North American Investment Authority. In 1982 he became Director General of the Ministry of Energy and Infrastructure.

In 1984 Lynn was elected to the Knesset on the Likud list. He was appointed chairman of the Subcommittee on Energy and of the Subcommittee for Road Safety, and also chaired the Parliamentary Inquiry Committee for Traffic Accidents.

He was re-elected in the 1988 elections after being placed 23rd on the Likud list. In his second term in the Knesset he chaired the Constitution, Law and Justice Committee till 1992.

In 1992 he decided not to run again as candidate to the Israeli Knesset, and established again his own law firm, specializing in arbitration and  government.

At the end of 2002 he was elected President of the Tel Aviv & Central Israel Chamber of Commerce and of the Federation of Israeli Chambers of Commerce. He also became a member of the board of the Eurochambres and was elected a member of the council of the World Chambers Federation (WCF), a worldwide organization of National Chambers of Commerce.

References

External links

1935 births
People from Jerusalem
Jews in Mandatory Palestine
Hebrew University of Jerusalem Faculty of Law alumni
UC Berkeley School of Law alumni
Israeli lawyers
Israeli businesspeople
Israeli civil servants
Israeli people of Moroccan-Jewish descent
Living people
Likud politicians
Liberal Party (Israel) politicians
Members of the 11th Knesset (1984–1988)
Members of the 12th Knesset (1988–1992)